Marshall Lambert Rohner (December 20, 1963 in Iowa – October 18, 2005 in Yucca Valley, California) was a guitarist whose credits include: T.S.O.L., The Cruzados, Jimmy and The Mustangs, Kenny Brown and Dino's Revenge.

Rohner appeared in several videos in the early MTV days including "Live at the Ritz" with the Cruzados.

Rohner was born in Iowa to Barbara Flaig and Lambert Rohner. However, Rohner spent most of his life in southern California.

His film credits include Road House starring Patrick Swayze, Kelly Lynch, Sam Elliott, Ben Gazzara, and John Doe of X. He was also featured in Voyage of the Rock Aliens starring Pia Zadora where he played "Dino" which is believed to be the origin of his band's name "Dino's Revenge." Dino’s Revenge included legendary blues guitarist Hollywood Fats, Kevan Hill (The Twisters), Butch Acevedo (L.T.D., Tina Turner) and Steven Ameche (Philip Bailey, Gary US Bonds).

He was known to keep a picture of his two children, Jeffrey and Leo, taped to the back of his amplifier during performances.

In the 1980s Rohner began experimenting with intravenous drugs. Rohner's drug use led him to several arrests, imprisonment and eventually AIDS. Rohner died on October 18, 2005 of AIDS-related causes in Yucca Valley, California where he had lived for ten years.

References

1965 births
2005 deaths
T.S.O.L. members
American rock guitarists
Glam metal  musicians
20th-century American guitarists
People from Yucca Valley, California
AIDS-related deaths in California